Chile at the 1952 Summer Olympics in Helsinki, Finland was the nation's ninth appearance out of twelfth editions of the Summer Olympic Games. The nation was represented by a team of 59 athletes, 55 males and 4 females, that competed in 33 events in 9 sports. This edition marked Chile's second and third Olympic medals, both in the silver category.

Medalists

Athletics

Basketball

Men's Team Competition
Main Round (Group D)
 Defeated Cuba (53-52)
 Defeated Egypt (74-46)
 Lost to France (43-52)
Final Round (Group B)
 Lost to Brazil (44-75)
 Lost to United States (55-103)
 Lost to Soviet Union (60-78)
Classification Matches
 5th/8th place: Defeated Bulgaria (60-53)
 5th/6th place: Defeated Brazil (58-49) → Fifth place
Team Roster
Pedro Araya Zabala
Rufino Bernedo Zorzano
Eduardo Cordero Fernández
Hugo Fernández Diez
Exequiel Figueroa Reyes
Juan Gallo Chinchilla
Erich Mahn Godoy
Victor Mahana Badrie
Juan Ostoic Ostoic
Hernán Ramos Muñoz
Alvaro Salvadores Salvi
Hernán Raffo Abarca
Orlando Silva Infante

Cycling

Road Competition
Men's Individual Road Race (190.4 km)
Hernán Masanés — did not finish (→ no ranking)
Héctor Droguett — did not finish (→ no ranking)
Héctor Mellado — did not finish (→ no ranking)
Hugo Miranda — did not finish (→ no ranking)

Track Competition
Men's 1.000m Time Trial
Hernán Masanés
 Final — 1:15.9 (→ 17th place)

Men's 1.000m Sprint Scratch Race
Hernán Masanés — 14th place

Equestrian

Football

Modern pentathlon

Three male pentathletes represented Chile in 1952.

Individual
 Nilo Floody
 Hernán Fuentes
 Luis Carmona

Team
 Nilo Floody
 Hernán Fuentes
 Luis Carmona

Rowing

Chile had one male rowers participate in one out of seven rowing events in 1952.

 Men's single sculls
 Carlos Adueza

Shooting

Two shooters represented Chile in 1952.

50 m pistol
 Enrique Ojeda

50 m rifle, three positions
 Juan Bizama

50 m rifle, prone
 Juan Bizama

Swimming

References

External links
Official Olympic Reports
International Olympic Committee results database

Nations at the 1952 Summer Olympics
1952
Olympics